Mundite is a uranium phosphate mineral with chemical formula: Al(UO2)3(PO4)2(OH)3·5(H2O). It contains aluminium and has a yellow tinge to it. It usually appears on sandstones or limestones.

References

Uranium(VI) minerals
Aluminium minerals
Phosphate minerals
Orthorhombic minerals
Minerals in space group 33
Minerals in space group 62